The Blackout challenge is an internet challenge based around a choking game, intending to restrict breathing for a set duration of time. It gained widespread notoriety on TikTok in 2021, primarily among children. It has been compared to other online challenges and hoaxes that have exclusively targeted a young audience. It has been linked to numerous deaths of children.

Origin and spread 
Choking games existed before the widespread use of social media. A 2008 CDC report identified 82 "probable choking-game deaths" between young people aged 6 to 19 between 1995 and 2007.

Similar challenges
Time magazine reported in 2018 that social media platforms made information about the concept more widespread, leading more children to attempt it alone rather than with others. In 2019, internet challenges that involved self-harm, such as the "Momo" and "Blue Whale" challenges, created widespread coverage online for allegedly encouraging children to commit suicide. The Atlantic reported that both were ultimately hoaxes that used local news reporting and concerned online posts to spread the challenges, which never became prevalent online.

Impact and lawsuits
The Washington Post has reported that TikTok ultimately ended up blocking search results for the challenge and related terms, instead presenting a warning message. The challenge has resulted in the deaths of between fifteen and twenty children. Several lawsuits have been filed against TikTok for allegedly causing the deaths of children who have attempted it, though all have ended up in dismissals based on legal immunity.

Paul Diamond, a district judge in Philadelphia, has ruled that the company was immune from a lawsuit under the Communications Decency Act and Section 230, which prevents liability based on the work of others.

See also
 List of Internet challenges
 List of Internet phenomena
 Choking game
 Benadryl challenge

References

Challenges
2021 in Internet culture
Suicide and the Internet